Keith Buckley (7 April 1941 – 1 December 2020) was an English actor who mostly appeared on television and films from 1958.

Career
Keith Buckley was born in April 1941 in Huddersfield, West Riding of Yorkshire and performed in school plays at Huddersfield College. He had many appearances in film and television, including The Avengers and Randall and Hopkirk in the 1960s and The New Avengers in the 1970s.

Personal life

Between the years 1959 and 1967, Keith Buckley was married to Bella Buckley, with whom he had two daughters. Then, he was in a partnership for nineteen years with the casting director Mary Selway, with whom he also had two daughters. In later years, he lived in the US with author Beverly Lowry before returning home to live in UK. He died in December 2020 at the age of 79.

Selected filmography
 Shadow of the Boomerang (1960) – Stockman
 King & Country (1964) – Corporal of Guard
 Attack on the Iron Coast (1968) – Commando No1 (uncredited)
 Alfred the Great (1969) – Hadric
 Spring and Port Wine (1970) – Arthur Gasket
 Wuthering Heights (1970) 
 The Go-Between (1971) – Stubbs
 The Pied Piper (1972) – Mattio
 Virgin Witch (1972) – Johnny
 Dr. Phibes Rises Again (1972) – Stewart
 The 14 (1973) – Mr. Whitehead
 Trial by Combat (1976) – Herald
 The Eagle Has Landed (1976) – Major Gericke
 The Spy Who Loved Me (1977) – HMS Ranger Crewman
 Hanover Street (1979) – Lieutenant Wells
 Tess (1979) – Postman
 Excalibur (1981) – Uryens
 The Star Chamber (1983) – Assassin
 John Wycliffe: The Morning Star (1984) – John of Gaunt
 Christopher Columbus (1985) – De Torres
 Half Moon Street (1986) – Hugo Van Arkady
 Sky Bandits (1986) – Von Schlussel
 Hawks (1988) – Dutch Doctor

References

External links

1941 births
2020 deaths
English male film actors
English male television actors
Male actors from Huddersfield